The British Juggling Convention (also known as The BJC) is an annual Juggling convention held in a different town or city in Britain every year. The event usually takes place in the Easter school holiday, usually lasting from the Wednesday to Sunday. The event is for all forms of juggling and object manipulation, plus many other circus skills. The BJC usually features many workshops, talks and shows during the day, renegade shows at night, and a public show on the Saturday.

BJC 2020 and 2021 were cancelled due to Covid, the next British Juggling Convention will be held in Ramsgate in 2023.

External links
 https://bjc2023.co.uk Official 2023 British Juggling Convention website
 http://www.thebritishjugglingconvention.co.uk  Over 500 pages of information concerning the BJC, its history, its culture, and many  tips on how to organise one.
 https://www.britishjugglingconvention.co.uk BJC website

Clubs and societies in the United Kingdom
Juggling conventions